Henry E. Nears (April 17, 1907 – October 16, 1974), nicknamed "Red", was an American Negro league outfielder in the 1940s.

A native of Checotah, Oklahoma, Nears played for the Memphis Red Sox in 1940. In five recorded games, he posted five hits in 12 plate appearances. Nears died in Austin, Texas in 1974 at age 67.

References

External links
 and Seamheads

1907 births
1974 deaths
Memphis Red Sox players
Baseball outfielders
Baseball players from Oklahoma
People from Checotah, Oklahoma
20th-century African-American sportspeople